Aka-Bass (Aqa-Bass), is a non-residential village in Galanchozhsky District, Chechnya.

Administrative and municipal status 
Municipally, Aka-Bass is incorporated into Gekhi-Chuyskoye rural settlement. It is one of the three settlements included in it.

Until 31 December 2019, Aka-Bass was included in Achkhoy-Martanovsky District, but on 1 January 2020 - was transferred to the control of Urus-Martanovsky District.

At the same time, Aka-Bass is the administrative center of Galanchozhsky District. The district is formally restored, but it is not a part of the administrative-territorial structure of the Chechen Republic.

Name 
Sometimes, Aka-Bass is wrongly called as Galanchozh. However, no village called Galanchozh exists, and Galanchozh is the name of the area in Aka-Bass and surrounding auls.

Geography 

Aka-Bass is located in the center of Galanchozhsky District, on the left bank of the Osu-Khi river.

The closest settlements and ruins to Aka-Bass are 'Amka to the north-west, Körga to the north-east, Ker-Bi-Te and 'Amye to the south-east, Chikondi-Pkhäda and Äkka to the south-west, and Ittar-Källa to the west.

History 
In 1929, a rebel government was established in Aka-Bass against the Bolshevik government in the mountains of Chechnya. During the next wave of resistance, a provisional rebel government was established in 1940 by members of the local armed forces.

In 1942, the Soviet Air Force carried out two large-scale bombings in the Chechen mountains, and Galanchozhsky District was particularly hard-hit by the attacks.

In 1944, after the ethnic cleansing and deportation of the Chechen and Ingush people and the Chechen-Ingush ASSR was abolished, the aul of Aka-Bass was abandoned and destroyed.

In 1957, after the Vaynakh people returned and the Chechen-Ingush ASSR was restored, former residents of Galanchozhsky District were forbidden to resettle there. As a result, most former residents of Aka-Bass resettled in the flat lands of the republic, mostly in the Achkhoy-Martanovsky, Sernovodsky and Groznensky districts.

In 2019, Aka-Bass was named as one of the first settlements in Galanchozhsky District to be rebuilt in order to resettle the area.

Infrastructure 
On 31 August 2019, the newly rebuilt mosque in Aka-Bass was opened. The mosque stands on the very same place that the old mosque stood before it was destroyed in 1944. However, there was still no permanent population in Aka-Bass at this time.

References 

Rural localities in Urus-Martanovsky District